Until recently, most studies on time travel are based upon classical general relativity. Coming up with a quantum version of time travel requires physicists to figure out the time evolution equations for density states in the presence of closed timelike curves (CTC).

Novikov had conjectured that once quantum mechanics is taken into account, self-consistent solutions always exist for all time machine configurations, and initial conditions. However, it has been noted such solutions are not unique in general, in violation of determinism, unitarity and linearity.

The application of self-consistency to quantum mechanical time machines has taken two main routes. Novikov's rule applied to the density matrix itself gives the Deutsch prescription. Applied instead to the state vector, the same rule gives nonunitary physics with a dual description in terms of post-selection.

Deutsch's prescription 
In 1991, David Deutsch came up with a proposal for the time evolution equations, with special note as to how it resolves the grandfather paradox and nondeterminism. However, his resolution to the grandfather paradox is considered unsatisfactory to some people, because it states the time traveller reenters another parallel universe, and that the actual quantum state is a quantum superposition of states where the time traveller does and does not exist.

He made the simplifying assumption that we can split the quantum system into a subsystem A external to the closed timelike curve, and a CTC part. Also, he assumed that we can combine all the time evolution between the exterior and the CTC into a single unitary operator U. This presupposes the Schrödinger picture. We have a tensor product for the combined state of both systems. He makes the further assumption there is no correlation between the initial density state of A and the density state of the CTC. This assumption is not time-symmetric, which he tried to justify by appealing to measurement theory and the second law of thermodynamics. He proposed that the density state restricted to the CTC is a fixed-point of
.
He showed that such fixed points always exist. He justified this choice by noting the expectation value of any CTC observable will match after a loop. However, this could lead to "multivalued" histories if memory is preserved around the loop. In particular, his prescription is incompatible with path integrals unless we allow for multivalued fields. Another point to note is in general, we have more than one fixed point, and this leads to nondeterminism in the time evolution. He suggested the solution to use is the one with the maximum entropy. Pure states can evolve into mixed states.

This leads to seemingly paradoxical resolutions to the grandfather paradox. Assume the external subsystem is irrelevant, and only a qubit travels in the CTC. Also assume during the course around the time machine, the value of the qubit is flipped according to the unitary operator
.
The most general fixed-point solution is given by

This is an example of the nonuniqueness of solutions. This leads to an interesting interpretation that if the qubit starts off with a value of 0, it will end up with a value of 1, and vice versa, but this should not be problematic according to Deutsch because the qubit ends up in a different parallel universe in the many worlds interpretation.

Later researchers have noted that if his prescription turned out to be right, computers in the vicinity of a time machine can solve PSPACE-complete problems.

However, it was shown in an article by Tolksdorf and Verch that Deutsch's CTC fixed point condition can be fulfilled to arbitrary precision in any quantum system described according to relativistic quantum field theory on spacetimes where CTCs are excluded, casting doubts on whether Deutsch's condition is really characteristic of quantum processes mimicking CTCs in the sense of general relativity.
In a later article,
the same authors have shown that  Deutsch's CTC fixed point condition can also be fulfilled in any system
subject to the laws of classical statistical mechanics, even if it is not built up by quantum systems. The authors conclude that hence, 
Deutsch's condition is not specific to quantum physics, nor does it depend on the quantum nature of a physical system so that it can be fulfilled.
In consequence, Tolksdorf and Verch further conclude that Deutsch's condition isn't sufficiently specific to allow statements about time travel scenarios or their hypothetical realization by quantum physics, and that Deutsch's attempt to explain the possibility of his proposed time-travel scenario using the many-world interpretation of quantum mechanics is misleading.

Lloyd's prescription 

An alternative proposal was later presented by Seth Lloyd based upon post-selection and path integrals. In particular, the path integral is over single-valued fields, leading to self-consistent histories. He assumed it is ill-defined to speak of the actual density state of the CTC itself, and we should only focus upon the density state outside the CTC. His proposal for the time evolution of the external density state is
, where .
If , no solution exists due to destructive interference in the path integral. For instance, the grandfather paradox has no solution, and leads to an inconsistent state. If a solution exists, it is clearly unique.

Entropy and computation 

A related description of CTC physics was given in 2001 by Michael Devin, and applied to thermodynamics. The same model with the introduction of a noise term allowing for inexact periodicity, allows the grandfather paradox to be resolved, and clarifies the computational power of a time machine assisted computer. Each time traveling qubit has an associated negentropy, given approximately by the logarithm of the noise of the communication channel. Each use of the time machine can be used to extract as much work from a thermal bath. In a brute force search for a randomly generated password, the entropy of the unknown string can be effectively reduced by a similar amount. Because the negentropy and computational power diverge as the noise term goes to zero, complexity class may not be the best way to describe the capabilities of time machines.

See also 
 Novikov self-consistency principle
 Grandfather paradox
 Ontological paradox

References 

Time travel
Quantum mechanics
Quantum gravity